Some People Change is the fifth studio album by American country music duo Montgomery Gentry. It was released by Columbia Records Nashville on October 24, 2006. Certified gold in the United States, the album produced three singles on the Billboard Hot Country Songs charts: the title track (previously cut by Kenny Chesney on his 2004 album When the Sun Goes Down), "Lucky Man", and "What Do Ya Think About That". The title track was a number seven hit on the Hot Country Songs charts, while "Lucky Man" became the duo's third Number One hit, and "What Do Ya Think About That" reached number three.

Sony BMG Nashville chairman Joe Galante thought that the duo and the label "strayed musically from what the base had been. They have an edge to their sound, and I think we got a little too soft."

Track listing

Personnel

Scott Baggett- bagpipes
Robert Bailey- background vocals
Angela Bennett Shelton- background vocals
Bekka Bramlett- background vocals
Pat Buchanan- acoustic guitar, harmonica
Tom Bukovac- acoustic guitar, electric guitar
David Campbell- string arrangements 
Perry Coleman- background vocals
Janice Corder- background vocals
Eric Darken- percussion
Everett Drake- background vocals
Dan Dugmore- acoustic guitar, steel guitar, lap steel guitar
Shannon Forrest- drums
Larry Franklin- fiddle
Troy Gentry- lead vocals, background vocals
Carl Gorodetzky- contractor
Kenny Greenberg- acoustic guitar, electric guitar
Vicki Hampton- background vocals
Tony Harrell- Hammond organ, piano
Emily Harris- background vocals
Wes Hightower- background vocals
Edward Jenkins- background vocals
B. James Lowry- acoustic guitar
Steve Mackey- bass guitar
Eddie Montgomery- lead vocals, background vocals
Greg Morrow- drums, percussion 
Wendy Moten- background vocals
Danny Myrick- background vocals
The Nashville String Machine- strings 
Russ Pahl- acoustic guitar, electric guitar, steel guitar, lap steel guitar
Billy Panda- electric guitar
Shandra Penix- background vocals
Michael Rhodes- bass guitar
Brent Rowan- electric guitar
Jeffrey Steele- electric guitar, harmonica, background vocals
Crystal Taliefero- background vocals
Neil Thrasher- background vocals
Reese Wynans- Hammond organ, piano

Technical

Hank Williams – mastering
Matt Anderson – engineering
Jeff Balding – engineering
Steve Blackmon – engineering
Greg Droman – engineering
Leslie Richter – engineering
Joey Turner – engineering
David Beano Hall – engineering
Brian Gill – engineering, mixing assistant
Steve Beers – assistant engineer
Todd Gunnerson – assistant engineer
Steve Marcantonio – engineering, mixing
Chip Matthews – engineering, mixing
J.C. Monterrosa – assistant engineer, engineer, mixing assistant
Tracy Baskette-Fleaner – art direction, design
James E Hackett III – assistant engineer
Judy Forde Blair – liner notes, production coordination
Margaret Malandruccolo – photography

Production
Mark Wright, Eddie Montgomery, and Troy Gentry - tracks 1, 4
Wright, Rivers Rutherford, and Jeffrey Steele - track 7
Wright and Rutherford - tracks 3, 9-12
Wright and Steele - tracks 2, 5, 6, 8, 13, 14

Chart performance

Weekly charts

Year-end charts

Singles

Certifications

References

2005 albums
Columbia Records albums
Montgomery Gentry albums
Albums produced by Mark Wright (record producer)